The theNNT is an evidence-based medicine website created by a small group led by David H. Newman and Graham Walker that collects statistical information about drugs, particularly the number needed to treat measure. The website was launched in 2010.

References 

American medical websites